James Douglas, 2nd Duke of Queensberry and 1st Duke of Dover (18 December 16626 July 1711) was a Scottish nobleman and a leading politician of the late 17th and the early 18th centuries. As Lord High Commissioner he was instrumental in negotiating and passing the Acts of Union 1707 with England, which created the Kingdom of Great Britain.

Life
He was the eldest son of William Douglas, 1st Duke of Queensberry and his wife Isabel Douglas, daughter of William Douglas, 1st Marquess of Douglas. His title before succeeding his father was Lord Drumlanrig.

Educated at the University of Glasgow, he was appointed a Scottish Privy Counsellor in 1684, and was lieutenant-colonel of Dundee's regiment of horse. He supported William III in 1688 and was appointed colonel of the Scots Troop, Horse Guards Regiment. On his father's death in 1695 he succeeded to several titles, including 2nd Duke of Queensberry.

He was appointed Lord High Treasurer of Scotland from 1693 and Keeper of the Privy Seal of Scotland from 1695 to 1702. In 1696 he was appointed as Extraordinary Lord of Session. He was Lord High Commissioner to the Parliament of Scotland in 1700, 1702 and 1703, in which role he procured the abandonment of the Darien scheme. He was appointed a Knight of the Garter in 1701.

On the accession of Queen Anne in 1702, Douglas was appointed Secretary of State for Scotland.  He encouraged the Jacobites by his undecided attitude on the question of the settlement, and was deluded into unconsciously furthering the Jacobite designs of Simon Fraser, 11th Lord Lovat. Lovat had used Queensberry's jealousy of the duke of Atholl to obtain a commission from him to get evidence in France which would implicate Atholl. The plot was betrayed to Atholl by Robert Ferguson, and Douglas withdrew from government in 1704.

He was reinstated as Keeper of the Privy Seal of Scotland in 1705, was a commissioner of the estates in 1706, and procured the signing of the Treaty of Union in 1707. For this he was very unpopular in Scotland, but he received a pension of £3,000 a year. He was created Duke of Dover, Marquess of Beverley and Earl of Ripon in 1708, and appointed to the British Privy Council in the same year. He was Secretary of State for Scotland from 1709 until his death. His under-secretary during this period was the writer Nicholas Rowe. Queensberry died at his house in Albemarle Street, Piccadilly, in 1711, of an "iliack passion" (intestinal obstruction). He was later reburied with his wife Marie at Durisdeer Parish Church in Nithsdale.

Queensberry House in Edinburgh is today part of the Scottish Parliament Building.

Family

He married Mary Boyle, daughter of The Viscount Dungarvan and had at least 3 children:
James (1697–1715). Insane; passed over from succeeding all his father's titles except the marquessate; he died unwed and childless
Charles (1698–1778), succeeded his father as duke. He had two sons, but both died childless.
Jane (1701–1729), married (as his first wife) The Earl of Dalkeith. Her descendants were the eventual inheritors of the family estates.

References

External links

|-

|-

1662 births
1711 deaths
British Life Guards officers
Deaths from bowel obstruction
102
Garter Knights appointed by William III
Commissioners of the Treasury of Scotland
Scottish representative peers
Members of the Privy Council of Scotland
Lords High Commissioner to the Parliament of Scotland
Alumni of the University of Glasgow
Scottish soldiers
Members of the Parliament of Scotland 1689–1702
Senators of the College of Justice
Extraordinary Lords of Session
Marquesses of Queensberry
Dukes of Dover
Peers of Great Britain created by Queen Anne